Fagitana is a genus of moths of the family Noctuidae.

Species
 Fagitana gigantea (Draudt, 1950)
 Fagitana littera (Guenée, 1852)

References
Natural History Museum Lepidoptera genus database
Fagitana at funet

Hadeninae